Farewell to the King is a 1989 American action adventure drama film written and directed by John Milius. It stars Nick Nolte, Nigel Havers, Frank McRae, and Gerry Lopez and is loosely based on the 1969 novel L'Adieu au Roi by Pierre Schoendoerffer. Longtime Milius collaborator Basil Poledouris composed the musical score.

Plot
During World War II, American deserter Learoyd escapes a Japanese firing squad. Hiding in the wilds of Borneo, Learoyd is adopted by a head-hunting tribe of Dayaks, who consider him divine because of his blue eyes. Before long, Learoyd is the reigning king of the Dayaks. When British soldiers approach him to rejoin the war against the Japanese, Learoyd resists.  When his own tribe is threatened by the invaders, Learoyd decides to fight for their rights and to protect their independence.

Main cast

 Nick Nolte as Learoyd
 Nigel Havers as Captain Fairbourne
 James Fox as Colonel Ferguson
 Marilyn Tokuda as Yoo
 Frank McRae as Sergeant Tenga
 Aki Aleong as Colonel Mitamura
 Marius Weyers as Sergeant Conklin
 William Wise as Dynamite Dave
 Gerry Lopez as Gwai
 Elan Oberon as Vivienne
 Choy Chang Wing as Lian
 Richard Morgan as Stretch Lewis
 John Bennett Perry as General Douglas MacArthur
 Michael Nissman as General Sutherland
 Wayne Pygram as Bren Armstrong

Production

Original novel
Pierre Schoendoerffer originally wrote the story as a film script. He then turned it into a novel, which was published in 1969 and became a best seller in France, selling over 300,000 copies in hardback. He made the lead character Irish because "the Irish are mad and I like mad people."

"I was wanting to make a great symphonic book on life and death: on how a man can struggle until the very end, without hope and without reason, just to be alive, even though half dead., even though suffering terribly, because life is so powerful. But on the other hand I was wanting to show that if suddenly a man discovers that he is not fulfilling his dream, then he does not want to live anymore."

The story had some basis in historical fact - Tom Harrisson's stay with the Dayaks during the Second World War was the inspiration for much of what happened in the novel along with the allied drop behind Japanese lines known as Operation Semut.

Development
The film was originally going to be made in 1972, directed by Schoendoerffer and produced by Robert Dorfman, starring Donald Sutherland. However, it was not made. John Milius was interested in the themes of the book. In 1976, he said:

"I liked the story because it was such a wonderful Kiplingesque adventure tale," Milius later said. "It was a theme I always respond to, a guy living free in the wild, and the world catching up to him. In many ways it's similar to Jeremiah Johnson. I thought if I kept plugging away at it, sooner or later I'd get to do it."
 
Milius announced he would make the film in 1984. Milius described the film as his "most ambitious work - something I've wanted to do for 15 years... It's a story that explores loyalties, concepts of freedom and justice. And contrasts a seemingly violent but also very innocent society with the most corrupt society of them all, the outside world.

"I have always wanted to write this story," Milius added. "Learoyd is a character who could have come out of one of those barbershop magazines of the '50s: 'I fought the (Japanese) with the headhunters in Borneo where I was king.' He's sitting on a throne with sloe-eyed beauties all around—a mai tai in one hand, a Thompson submachine gun in the other. There is some sort of primitive appeal in that to all of us. But the studios were never very excited about it. I don't know if they are now."

"You wouldn't call `Farewell to the King' a right-wing establishment movie, it's certainly not in favor of empire," said Milius. "I think this movie is the most honest depiction of my politics. It's also hopelessly romantic: I'm just a romantic fool."
 
Nick Nolte was cast in the lead for a fee of $3 million.

"Thirty years ago it would have been Robert Mitchum," said Milius. "He was an average, proletarian man, not upper class. Leroyd was a slob in paradise. He was a deserter, troublemaker, a '30s labor organizer, the sort of loveable guy that had great ideals, much more than Nigel [Havers, who plays the botanist], who has all the refinement of culture and empire. He looks at this guy and realizes that he is a great man."

"I would say it's a film about loyalty and trust, freedom and justice," said Nolte. "And it compares a savage but innocent society to the outside world which is the most corrupt society of all."

"I'm a story teller," said Milius. "I'm a modern technology version of the Borneo tribal storyteller who squats near the fire in the long house and tells his tale. We're all telling the same tale. It's about the struggle of people to survive and, more important, to be free. It's about the necessity of making moral choices - and their costs. But it seems more real when you see where it really happened - and the people it really happened to.  It's set in the 1940s and many people lost their freedom in the 1940s and were taking action and having adventures to get it back. Human beings like to hear stories about how they've survived and stayed free."

Filming
Filming started 24 August 1987. The film was shot on location in Borneo (Bau District, Sarawak, Malaysia). Nolte arrived in Borneo a month before filming began. "We could have shot this film in the Philippines for a lot less money", he says. "But this is where it happened. These are the real people. These are real Iban. This is the land of Rajah Brooke. You know, the older I get, the more I feel I am like a Viking."

"This is a tough film, but you kind of like the toughness of it here", said Milius on location. "This is an adventure. If you're a romantic like me, you think of yourself out building the Panama Canal, or being the Rajah Brooke. You can't think of that if you're in a rainstorm in the San Fernando Valley."

Milius' then-girlfriend played Haver's fiancée.

Editing
Post-production was to be done in England but the falling US dollar meant that it was done in Los Angeles. According to Milius, the film was his best movie but it was "completely cut to pieces" by executives at the studio. In February 1989 he said, "Orion isn't behind it. They don't think it is going to be big at the box office. You put all the sweat and blood you can into it, and the outcome is whatever happens."

Milius would have liked to have been able to exceed the two-hour running time limit by 10 minutes, and preferred his silent action sequences accompanied by Basil Poledouris music over the release print's realistic, percussive sound effects. "The music was played down," he said. "It was a beautiful score. The producers' attitude is: `We paid for the gunshot, let's hear it.'" He was also unhappy the edit removed how Learoyd managed to unify the Dyak tribes by getting the women to hold a sex strike. He later said
[The film] was thrown away. I, as usual, was attacked viciously but in time it's come to be regarded as one of my best. In a way - I don't know why - I guess this film is more heartfelt than anything I've done since Big Wednesday... The producers - Al Ruddy and Andre Morgan - who are friends of mine now - were lied to by Orion executives. They did a very careful divide-and-conquer and turned us against each other. They [Ruddy and Morgan] would love to recut it the way I wanted... We'd all love to recut that movie and rerelease it. 
Mike Medavoy, Milius' former agent who was head of Orion Pictures at the time, wrote in 2002 that:
Many things stopped Farewell to the King from being successful. There were endless arguments between Al and John, and between John and us over the cutting of the film. John ended up being mad at me for years, but we've become close friends again. In the end, the film just didn't play. Perhaps audiences weren't ready to see a white soldier become the king of an indigenous tribe in Borneo. It was one of a group of daring Orion movies that didn't make money but, in retrospect, is a movie we are all very proud to have been a part of.

Reception 
Review aggregation website Rotten Tomatoes retrospectively collected reviews from 11 critics and gave the film a score of 55%, with an average rating of 5.5 out of 10.

Roger Ebert gave the film 3/4 stars. Ebert praised Nolte for his skill as actor, and his ability to inhabit a role rather than merely visit.

Milius later said he felt he had made a "great film".

DVD
Farewell to the King was released to DVD by MGM Home Entertainment on 6 June 2006.

References

External links
 
 

 
 
Review of film at The New York Times
Review of film at The Washington Post
Review of film at Los Angeles Times
Review of film at the Quietus

1989 films
1980s action drama films
1980s action adventure films
1989 independent films
1980s war films
American adventure drama films
Films based on French novels
American independent films
Orion Pictures films
American World War II films
Films set in the 1940s
War adventure films
American war drama films
Pacific War films
Films scored by Basil Poledouris
Films directed by John Milius
Films with screenplays by John Milius
Films set in Borneo
Films about royalty
1989 drama films
Japan in non-Japanese culture
Films about deserters
1980s English-language films
1980s American films